Nandakumar Chaugule (born 14 October 1955) is an ex Deputy Commissioner of Police, Maharashtra. He has served 38 years in police service and has received Presidents Medal for Meritorious Service on 24 January 2010. During the 1993 Bombay bombings, he was in charge of the bomb detection and disposal squad and played a vital role in promoting safety and the capture of the accused within 24 hours, his work is described in the book Black Friday: The True Story of the Bombay Bomb Blasts by Hussain Zaidi, also his character is played by Zakir Hussain as Inspector NandKumar Chougale in the film Black Friday (2007 film) (2007).

Early life
Post completion of two years training course at Police Training College, Nasik, Nandkumar Anant Chaugule was selected for the post of Sub-Inspector of Police in October 1975.

Career
He has served his services in several regions across Mumbai Kherwadi, Sahar Airport, Thane, Oshiwara, Navi Mumbai and Nashik. Worked across several sections such as State CID (Int), M.S. Mumbai, Bomb Detection and Disposal Squad, Airport Security and Administration and Traffic Branch.

His exceptional cases include:
 Detention of drug dealer Amir Khan under MPDA
 Arresting armed Tamil Terrorist Elango Natrajah of LTTE
 In Charge of the Bomb Detection and Disposal Squad, he played a crucial role during the 1993 Bomb blast including recovering lethal weapons, vital evidences from the 12 blast sites which were key in arrests of the accused within 24 hours .
 One of the biggest RDX haul ever seized in the country of over 1000 kg of RDX 
 Several other cases of arrest, bomb blasts and capture of terrorists.
He retired in 2013 and now lives in Mumbai.

References

1955 births
Living people